John Sumner DD (d. 26 February 1772) was an English Anglican priest and educationalist.

Career
Sumner was born in Windsor was educated at Eton College and King's College, Cambridge, grading BA in 1729, MA in 1732, and DD in 1744.

He was appointed:
Fellow of Kings in 1727
Assistant master of Eton College, 1734–1745
Headmaster of Eton College, 1745–1754
Rector of Barwick-in-Elmet, Yorkshire, 1750–1772
Rector of Castleford, 1753–1772
Rector of St Benet Finck, 1772
Canon of Windsor from 1751 to 1772.
Provost of King's College, Cambridge 1756 -1772
Vice-Chancellor of the University of Cambridge 1756–1757, and 1770–1771.

Notes 

1772 deaths
Canons of Windsor
Head Masters of Eton College
People educated at Eton College
Alumni of King's College, Cambridge
Year of birth missing
Provosts of King's College, Cambridge
Fellows of King's College, Cambridge
People from Windsor, Berkshire
18th-century English Anglican priests
Vice-Chancellors of the University of Cambridge